Fabio Reinhart (born 23 March 1942 in Bellinzona) is a Swiss architect.

Biography
Reinhart studied architecture at the Polytechnic of Zürich, where he graduated in 1969.

In the 1970s he got associated with Bruno Reichlin and opened a practice in Lugano. They were strongly influenced by Italian architect Aldo Rossi.

Reinhart has been a professor of architecture at the ETH Zurich since 1985, and at the Gesamthochschule Kassel since 1987.

Reference works
 Tonini House, Torricella-Taverne, Switzerland (1974)
 Sartori House, Riveo, Switzerland (1976)
 Croci House, Mendrisio, Switzerland (1979–89)
 Factory at Coesfeld-Lette, Germany (1983-7; with Santiago Calatrava)
 Motorway hotel, Bellinzona, Switzerland (1990)
 Parliament of Albania, Tirana, Albania (2007)

References

External links

1942 births
Living people
People from Bellinzona
ETH Zurich alumni
Swiss architects
Architects from Ticino
Academic staff of ETH Zurich
Academic staff of the University of Kassel